Shadle Park High School is a four-year public secondary school in the northwest United States, located in the Audubon/Downriver neighborhood of Spokane, Washington. Northwest of downtown Spokane, Shadle Park was the first new high school in the city in a quarter century when it opened  in 1957. Part of Spokane Public Schools, it had an enrollment of 1,348 students in 2019.

History

Modernization and addition
In 2009, a major project was completed to expand and modernize the school. This was funded through the support of the Spokane community in passing a $165.3 million facility improvement bond in March 2003. Designed to serve 1,600 students and accommodate a vigorous career and technical education program, the project was conceived as a modernization with minor remodeling of the 1994 gym and new additions.

Designed by NAC Architecture, the project retained, modernized and renovated the original 1957 building. The modernization of the facility included creating a public-friendly and efficient layout with many views towards the park to the west. The demolition of the vacant Field Elementary School, on the corner of Wellesley and Ash, created additional parking spaces for visitors and staff.

During construction, students remained on campus. A multi-phase construction approach was utilized over the 24+ month modernization with extensive use of portable classrooms as well as the old elementary school (Field School) on the north end of the property.

Academics 
Shadle Park offers a variety of Advanced Placement classes:
AP Calculus
AP Statistics
AP English Language and Composition
AP English Literature and Composition
AP Biology
AP Chemistry
AP Environmental Science
AP Physics
AP Psychology
AP Digital Photography
AP Seminar
AP U.S. History
AP U.S. Government and Politics
AP Comparative Government
AP World History
AP Human Geography

Principals 
William Taylor (1957-1971)
Keith Rostvold (1971-1978)
Jack Mathews (1978-1985)
James Hutton (1985-1990)
Michael Dunn (1990-1996)
Emmett Arndt (1996-2001)
Thomas Gresch (2001-2004)
Herbert Rotchford (2004-2011)
Eric Sylling (2011-2016)
Julie S. Lee (2016–2021)
Chris Dunn (2021-Present)

Notable alumni 
Bryan Braman, NFL linebacker (Philadelphia Eagles)
Michael Chiesa, winner of Season 15 of The Ultimate Fighter, professional mixed martial artist currently signed with the Ultimate Fighting Championship
 Terry Davis, novelist and professor in the English department at Minnesota State University, Mankato
Jerry Hendren, NFL wide receiver (Denver Broncos); class of 1966
Don Lynch, author and historian for the Titanic Historical Society
Craig Mitchell, MLB player (Oakland Athletics)
Matty Mullins, lead singer/vocalist for Memphis May Fire
John Roskelley, mountaineer, author; class of 1967
Derek Ryan, current NHL player (Calgary Flames)
Rob Ryan, MLB player (Arizona Diamondbacks, Oakland Athletics)
Brett Rypien, NFL quarterback (Denver Broncos)
Mark Rypien, NFL quarterback, MVP of Super Bowl XXVI; class of 1981

References

External links 
 

Schools in Spokane, Washington
Educational institutions established in 1957
High schools in Spokane County, Washington
Spokane Public Schools
Public high schools in Washington (state)
1957 establishments in Washington (state)